Krinos Foods, Inc. is a United States private company based in New York that imports and produces Greek and other Mediterranean foods. It is one of the largest Greek food importers in North America. The company headquarters are in the Long Island City section of Queens, but it has purchased a site to move to the Bathgate Industrial Park in the Tremont section of the Bronx. In addition to New York, the company has manufacturing facilities in Chicago, Toronto, and Montreal.

Products and history

Krinos both imports and manufactures Greek, Italian, Indian, and Middle Eastern foods, including "cheeses, peppers, olives, ... cookies", phyllo, olive and other vegetable oils, figs, halva, grape leaves, yogurt, wines and beers (including Mythos beer from Greece), coffee, tea, fruit juices and nectars. In the mid-2000s, the company was receiving approximately $18,000 a year in payments for the participation of its Long Island City plant in a remote power cut-off program with Enernoc of Boston.

Together with two other food importers, Big Alpha Foods Inc. and Doric Foods Inc., Krinos was formerly controlled by John Moschalaidis, who founded it in 1985 or earlier. In 1988 he was sentenced to two years' imprisonment after pleading guilty to importing contaminated cheese and mislabeling dairy products. His son, Eric Moschalaidis, is currently chairman of the company. Krinos was also found in 1990 to be selling a banned dye for Easter eggs, and in 1997 to be selling mislabeled cooking oil. In 2005 an investigation by WABC reported on by ABC's Good Morning America showed that some of the company's extra-virgin olive oil contained cheaper ingredients.

In 2004 Krinos acquired Hellas International, a Greek food company headquartered in Salem, Massachusetts.

Logo

The company logo features a letter "K" formed by two green olive leaves against a brown stem.

References

External links
 Official website
 Krinos Foods Canada

Food manufacturers of the United States
Companies based in New York City
Food and drink companies based in New York City